Where an adjective is a link, the link is to the language or dialect of the same name. (Reference: Ethnologue, Languages of the World)

References

India